The Blackening is a 2022 American comedy horror film directed by Tim Story and co-written by Tracy Oliver and Dewayne Perkins, who also stars. Expanded from a 2018 short film by the improv comedy troupe 3Peat, the film follows an all-Black group of friends who encounter a killer while staying at a cabin in the woods. 

The cast includes Antoinette Robertson, Dewayne Perkins, Sinqua Walls, Grace Byers, X Mayo, Melvin Gregg, Jermaine Fowler, Yvonne Orji, Jay Pharoah and James Preston Rogers.

The film premiered at the 2022 Toronto International Film Festival on September 16, 2022, and was second runner-up for the People's Choice Award for Midnight Madness. Lionsgate is set to distribute the film theatrically on Juneteenth weekend, June 16, 2023.

Premise 
The film interrogates the trope that the African-American character is often the first to die in horror movies by placing an all-Black group of friends at a cabin in the woods, where they are confronted with a masked killer who demands that they rank their degrees of blackness so that he can determine the correct order in which to kill them, and must rely on a combination of street smarts and their own knowledge of horror film tropes to survive.

Cast
 Antoinette Robertson as Lisa
 Dewayne Perkins as Dewayne
 Sinqua Walls as Nnamdi
 Grace Byers as Allison
 X Mayo as Shanika
 Melvin Gregg as King
 Jermaine Fowler as Clifton
 Yvonne Orji as Morgan
 Jay Pharoah as Shawn
 James Preston Rogers as Camden Conner

Critical response
Joe Lipsett of Bloody Disgusting rated the film four out of five, writing that "While the kills in The Blackening are decent and the killer’s choice of weapon (a crossbow) is novel, it’s the comedy and camaraderie between the friends that make the film stand out. Not only do these characters fight and support each other as real friends do, but Perkins and Oliver’s script is also filled to the brim with smart, savvy jokes. The film is legitimately hilarious, tackling everything from obvious stereotypes to ingrained cultural prejudice within the group."

For IndieWire, Rafael Motamayor graded the film a B, calling it "the first great horror parody of the post-Get Out era" and writing that "every slasher movie needs a good villain and here the killer wears a blackface leather mask. It’s on the nose, but this parody has about as much subtext as Scary Movie and that’s part of the fun. There is no toning down Blackness or explaining things to white audiences. If you don’t know how to play Spades or what the Black anthem is, ask a friend."

References

External links

2022 films
2022 comedy horror films
2020s American films
2020s English-language films
2020s parody films
2020s slasher films
African-American comedy horror films
American parody films
American slasher films
Features based on short films
Films directed by Tim Story
Lionsgate films
Media Rights Capital films
Parodies of horror
Slasher comedy films